KDEV-LP, UHF analog channel 40, was a low-powered MeTV-affiliated television station licensed to Cheyenne, Wyoming, United States. The station was owned by Stratus Media Holdings.

History
A construction permit for a low-power station on channel 40 in Cheyenne was granted on March 15, 2004 and assigned the call sign K40HP; on October 4, the station's call sign was changed to KKTU-LP. On June 24, 2008, the station's call sign was changed to KDEV-LP.

The station carried ABC programming from KTWO-TV, the ABC affiliate in Casper, after equipment failure of KQCK's analog facilities on June 27, 2008.

In August 2009, KDEV-LP, K61DX in Laramie and K21CV in Rawlins were sold to Fusion Communications, after the bankruptcy of former owner Equity Media Holdings.

In September 2009, ABC programming was moved to KLWY's 27.2 subchannel as a simulcast of KTWO. On September 15, 2010, KDEV (after being off the air for a year) reemerged as a MyNetworkTV affiliate. As of 2011, KDEV now carries MeTV. In 2012, Fusion Communications was acquired by Stratus Media Holdings. KDEV-LP left the air on September 28, 2012 in order to upgrade the station's equipment to a fiber-based system; it never resumed broadcasting, and on September 26, 2013 Stratus returned its license to the Federal Communications Commission, which canceled it on September 30.

References

DEV-LP
Defunct television stations in the United States
Television channels and stations established in 2007
2007 establishments in Wyoming
Television channels and stations disestablished in 2012
2012 disestablishments in Wyoming
DEV-LP